Hugues "Hugh" Quennec (born 28 June 1965) was the principal owner and president of the two primary sports teams of Geneva, Switzerland: Genève-Servette HC (GSHC) and Servette FC. He held Genève-Servette HC from 2005 until being bought out for a symbolic fee of 1 Swiss franc (CHF) in 2017 and helmed Servette FC from March 2012 until 2015.  

He had been the president of GSHC for seven years when Servette FC began experiencing significant financial difficulties in early 2012. He agreed to purchase Servette FC for a symbolic fee of 1.00 CHF in March 2012. Quennec was able to successfully turn around the club's financial difficulties, avoiding bankruptcy and ensuring the club would continue to participate in the Swiss Super League for the 2012–13 season.

Personal life 
Quennec was born in Montreal, Quebec, Canada to a Swiss mother from Fribourg and a French father from Brittany. He holds both Canadian and Swiss citizenship.

His daughter, Kaleigh Quennec, is a member of the Swiss women's national ice hockey team.

References

1965 births
Living people
Businesspeople from Montreal
Canadian people of Swiss-French descent
Canadian sports executives and administrators
Ice hockey executives
Ice hockey people from Quebec
Servette FC
Soccer people from Quebec
Swiss people of Canadian descent
Swiss sports executives and administrators